Laelia rosea is a species of orchid native to Colombia, Venezuela and Guyana.

References

External links

rosea